The Moon Is... the Sun's Dream is a 1992 South Korean film directed by Park Chan-wook in his feature directorial debut.

Plot
Mu-hoon, a gangster in Busan, is the half brother of Ha-young, a successful photographer. When Mu-hoon is caught having an affair with his boss' mistress Eun-ju, the two run off with their organization's money. They are soon caught, but although Mu-hoon escapes, Eun-ju is given a scar on her cheek as punishment, and sold into prostitution. A year later, Mu-hoon finds a photograph of Eun-ju in Ha-young's studio, but although he is able to rescue her, he is eventually tracked down by the mob. Threatened with Eun-ju's death, Mu-hoon accepts a job to kill a man, only to discover that his target is in fact his old gang friend Man-cheol.

Cast
 Lee Seung-chul as Mu-hoon
 Na Hyun-hee as Eun-ju
 Song Seung-hwan as Ha-young
 Bang Eun-hee as Su-mi
 Lee Ki-yeol as Du-mok
 Kim Dong-soo as Man-cheol
Kim Ye-ryeong also made one of her first appearances on-screen, playing a coordinator.

External links
 
 The Moon Is... the Sun's Dream at the Korean Movie Database
 The Moon Is... the Sun's Dream at parkchanwook.org
 The Moon Is... the Sun's Dream at Naver 
 The Moon Is... the Sun's Dream at Cine21 

1992 films
Films directed by Park Chan-wook
1990s Korean-language films
South Korean crime thriller films
1992 directorial debut films